Oliver Harris (born 1976), better known as Harris, is a German rapper from Berlin-Kreuzberg. He founded the hip hop duo Spezializtz and the record label G.B.Z. Imperium with Dean Dawson. Together with Sido, he forms the duo Deine Lieblings Rapper.

Personal life
Harris was born in Germany to an African-American soldier father, and a German mother.

Discography

Albums
 2003 – Dirty Harry
 2005 – Dein Lieblingsalbum (with Sido as Deine Lieblings Rapper)
 2010 – '' Der Mann im Haus

Singles
 2001 – "Grundkurs"
 2003 – "Sind wir nicht alle ein bisschen Jiggy?"
 2005 – "Steh wieder auf" (with Sido as Deine Lieblings Rapper)
 2011 – "Stell dir eine Welt vor" (feat. Sido)

References

External links
  G.B.Z. Imperium website
  Deine Lieblings Rapper website (archived)

Musicians from Berlin
1976 births
Living people
German rappers
German people of African-American descent
People from Friedrichshain-Kreuzberg